Elena Frumosu (born November 22, 1968) is a politician from Moldova. She has served as a member of the Parliament of Moldova since 2011.

References

External links 
 Parlamentul Republicii Moldova

1968 births
Living people
Liberal Democratic Party of Moldova MPs
Moldovan MPs 2010–2014
Moldovan female MPs
21st-century Moldovan women politicians